The Cabinet of Casimir Périer was announced on 13 March 1831 by King Louis Philippe I.
It replaced the Cabinet of Jacques Laffitte. 
Perier died of cholera on 16 May 1832.
Louis-Philippe acted as president of the council until 11 October 1832, when the cabinet was replaced by the first cabinet of Nicolas Jean-de-Dieu Soult.

Ministers

The ministers in Périer's cabinet and under Louis-Philippe after Périer died were:

Changes
On 27 April 1832:

References

Sources

French governments
1831 establishments in France
1832 disestablishments in France
Cabinets established in 1831
Cabinets disestablished in 1832